Theodore Xenophon Barber (1927–2005) and David Smith Calverley (1937–2008) were American psychologists who studied "hypnotic behaviour".  They measured how susceptible patients were to hypnotic induction.  One result of their research was showing that the hypnotic induction was not superior to motivational instructions in producing a heightened state of suggestibility.  The Barber Suggestibility Scale, a product of their research, measures hypnotic susceptibility with or without the use of a hypnotic induction.

References 

20th-century American psychologists
American skeptics
Critics of parapsychology
Duos
Hypnosis